Faik Kamberović (born 25 July 1967) is a retired Bosnian footballer who played as a forward for several clubs in Slovenia, Croatia and Austria.

Club career
He was Slovenian PrvaLiga top scorer in the 1997–98 season. He scored three goals for Croatian side Varteks Varaždin in the 1998–99 UEFA Cup Winners' Cup, surprisingly beating Eredivisie team SC Heerenveen and reaching the quarter finals of the tournament. He als played in the Austrian lower leagues and in the First League of the Federation of Bosnia and Herzegovina for Budućnost Banovići.

References

External links
 Slovenian career stats - PrvaLiga
Faik Kamberović profile at 1HNL.net 

1967 births
Living people
Association football forwards
Bosnia and Herzegovina footballers
NK Celje players
NK Varaždin players
NK Korotan Prevalje players
SC Eisenstadt players
First Vienna FC players
FK Budućnost Banovići players
Slovenian PrvaLiga players
Croatian Football League players
Austrian Regionalliga players
First League of the Federation of Bosnia and Herzegovina players
Bosnia and Herzegovina expatriate footballers
Expatriate footballers in Slovenia
Bosnia and Herzegovina expatriate sportspeople in Slovenia
Expatriate footballers in Croatia
Bosnia and Herzegovina expatriate sportspeople in Croatia
Expatriate footballers in Austria
Bosnia and Herzegovina expatriate sportspeople in Austria